Moreno Esseboom (born 2 November 1982 in Amsterdam) is a Dutch footballer who played for Eerste Divisie club FC Volendam during the 2001–02 football season.

Club career
He later played for amateur sides Wherevogels, Purmersteijn, 
 Oosthuizen and FC Purmerend.

References

1982 births
Living people
Footballers from Amsterdam
Dutch footballers
Association football forwards
SC Telstar players
FC Volendam players
Eerste Divisie players